Saints Maximos and Domadious are saints in the Coptic Orthodox Church.

Life 
Maximos and Domadious were the sons of a Roman governor named Valentinian. Their father was a Christian and raised them as Christians. At a young age, they decided to become monks asked their father to send them to Nicaea so they could pray where the First Council of Nicaea had taken place. Their father rejoiced and sent a group of soldiers with them. When they arrived at the place, they asked the soldiers to return to their parents and tell them that they had decided to stay there.

They recognized a monk named Hanna who asked them to go to Syria to learn the origins of monastic life by a monk named Aghabus. When Aghabus felt close to the date of his death, he told them that he saw a vision and a man named Macarius of Egypt told him that Maximos and Domadious should go to him in Egypt after his death.

At that time, the Patriarch of Constantinople died. King Theodosius asked to see the monk Maximos to told him he wished to make him the patriarch of Constantinople. When Maximos and Domadious learned of this, they fled together and stayed with one of the shepherds, where they prayed to Christ to guide them to Macarius.
They traveled about nine days near the seashore, and found themselves in Šihēt (the valley of Natrun now). Macarius met them and helped them build a modest house and taught them a simple work to support themselves.
They did not deal with anyone or go out of their house except to go to Saint Macarius to take holy sacraments. Macarius marveled at their silence and that during that time they did not talk to him, so he went to their place of residence and stayed there. And during the night he awoke and saw Maximos and Domadious praying, surrounded by a light from heaven and an angel guarding them with a sword of fire.  Macarius shouted, "Pray for me"

Death 
Maximus began to get sick with a violent fever. He asked his younger brother to go to Macarius. And when he came to him, he found him overheated and say "Lord, send me your light to shine in front of me in this way that I do not know. My God and my Creator saved me from the forces of darkness gathered in the air, and repaired my steps in this way to tell you straightly. And be my grace and strength, my God and my lord, because you are the Lord of light and the Savior of the world". And light surrounded the place and a group of prophets, apostles, saints, John the Baptist and the king Constantine were all standing around the saint until he delivered his pure spirit. Macarius cried and said, "Blessed are you Maximos" this was on the 14th of the month of Tobi.

Dumadios cried bitterly, and asked St. Macarius to ask Christ to bring him to his brother. Three days later, he suffered from a severe fever, and Macarius was told about it and went to visit him. While he was on the way, he stood for a long time looking toward the cave, then turned to the east. Those people with him thought that he was praying but he was contemplating the Church of the Saints who were advancing the spirit of St. Domadius. Macarius looked up at the sky, crying and knocking his chest, saying, "Domadius has departed". This was on the 17th of the month of Tobi.

Macarius built a church in their place of residence, the first church built in the wilderness. Maximos and Domadious were the first monks to die in Šihēt.

References 

380 deaths
Saints from Roman Egypt
Eastern Orthodox saints